Two submarines of the French Navy have borne the name Ouessant:

 , a  launched in 1936 and scuttled in 1940
 , an  launched in 1978 and sold to Malaysia in 2009

French Navy ship names